Virtual Valerie 2 (also known as Mike Saenz's Virtual Valerie 2) is an erotic video game released for MacOS System 7 by Reactor in 1995. At the No-Tell Motel, Valerie has virtual sex with the player. The goal is to help Valerie achieve orgasm.

References

1995 video games
DOS games
DOS-only games
Erotic video games
Video games developed in the United States